Lee Ann Newsom is an Associate Professor of Anthropology at the Pennsylvania State University at University Park.  She has written numerous books and articles.  She was awarded a MacArthur Fellowship in 2002.

Education and career

Newsom received all of her degrees in Anthropology, all from the University of Florida.

 Bachelor's degree 1982
 Master's degree 1986
 Doctor of Philosophy 1993

References

American anthropologists
Living people
MacArthur Fellows
Pennsylvania State University faculty
University of Florida College of Liberal Arts and Sciences alumni
Year of birth missing (living people)